.tf is the Internet country code top-level domain (ccTLD) for the French Southern and Antarctic Lands. Along with .fr, .pm, .re, .wf and .yt it is administered by AFNIC. Before 23 October 2004, Adamsnames, based in Cambridge in the United Kingdom, administered this TLD.

The French Southern and Antarctic Lands are territories either recognised as French or claimed by France but suspended under the Antarctic Treaty System, and the domain name derives from the French, Terres australes et antarctiques françaises. Part of the French claim includes a section of the continent of Antarctica, creating an overlap between .tf and the general Antarctica domain .aq.

Usage 
The .tf domain-name has popular usage for sites related to the game Team Fortress 2 (TF2). Many of these sites are commonly used for marketing of virtual goods originating from Team Fortress 2 and, by extension, the Steam Community Market. Examples of these sites are backpack.tf, scrap.tf, and marketplace.tf, which all facilitate trade relating to TF2 items and goods.

British domain holders after Brexit 
Due to the UK's withdrawal from the European Union, as of 1 January 2021, UK residents are not able to register any new .tf domains. However, AFNIC has stated that all domains registered before 31 December 2020 by Britons will not be affected.

See also 
 Internet in France
 ISO 3166-2:TF
 .fr –CC TLD for France
 .eu –CC TLD for the European Union

References

External links
 IANA .tf whois information
 AFNIC
 Official website of the French Southern and Antarctic Lands
 Old .tf official information website

Computer-related introductions in 1997
Country code top-level domains
Internet in France
French Southern and Antarctic Lands
Council of European National Top Level Domain Registries members

sv:Toppdomän#T